Ornipholidotos ntebi is a butterfly in the family Lycaenidae. It is found in Uganda, western Kenya, north-western Tanzania and the north-eastern part of the Democratic Republic of the Congo. The habitat consists of forests.

Adults mimic day-flying arctiid moths.

References

Butterflies described in 1906
Ornipholidotos